Whispers II is the sixth studio album from British singer-songwriter Passenger, and is a sequel to his fifth studio album, Whispers. It was released on 20 April 2015 in different countries, through Black Crow Records. All profits from the album will go towards UNICEF UK. The album was produced by Mike Rosenberg and Chris Vallejo.

Background
In March 2015 Passenger announced details of his sixth studio album, confirming the UK release date as 20 April 2015. He also announced that all profits from the album will go towards UNICEF UK’s initiative in Liberia. Talking about working with UNICEF, he said, "It's so exciting to be able to work with Unicef on such an important campaign. Money raised from these sales will go directly towards food and supplements to help bring severely malnourished kids back to health, facility upgrades and maintenance, education and training for health workers in the region."

Track listing
All tracks were written by Mike Rosenberg.

Charts

Release history

References

2015 albums
Passenger (singer) albums